Some Kinda... is the second studio album by American musician Dwele. It was released on October 4, 2005 via Virgin Records. Recording sessions took place at Modat Studios in Detroit, Studio A in Dearborn Heights, Waynee Boy Studios in Royal Oak, Planet 2 Planet Studios in New York, 916 Music Studios in Hollywood, and Unsung Studios in Sherman Oaks. Production was mainly handled by Dwele himself, in addition to G-1, J Dilla and Mike City. It features guest appearances from Antwan Gardner, Boney James, Poppa Yo and Slum Village. The album peaked at number 54 on the Billboard 200 and number 10 on the Top R&B/Hip-Hop Albums.

Track listing

Charts

References

External links

2005 albums
Dwele albums
Virgin Records albums
Albums produced by G-One
Albums produced by J Dilla
Albums produced by Mike City